Yudai Township is a township under the administration of Wanyuan City in far northeastern Sichuan province, China. , it has seven villages under its administration.

References 

Township-level divisions of Sichuan
Wanyuan